Hardwick is a census-designated place (CDP) in Baldwin County, Georgia, United States. The population was 3,329 at the 2020 census, down from 5,819 in 2000, at which time it was listed as Midway-Hardwick. It is laid out around Central State Hospital. It is part of the Milledgeville Micropolitan Statistical Area. The zip code for Hardwick is 31034. Hardwick was home to Oglethorpe University during the 19th century.

Geography
Hardwick is located at  (33.052571, -83.237130).

Demographics

2020 census

As of the 2020 United States census, there were 3,513 people, 1,401 households, and 648 families residing in the CDP.

Government and infrastructure
Baldwin State Prison (previously Georgia Women's Correctional Institution) of the Georgia Department of Corrections is located in Milledgeville, near Hardwick.

Notable person
William Usery, Jr., United States Secretary of Labor (1976–1977)

References

Census-designated places in Baldwin County, Georgia
Census-designated places in Georgia (U.S. state)
Milledgeville micropolitan area, Georgia